Ariel Heath Dean (January 1, 1922 – July 21, 1973) was an American actress. She is best known for appearing in The Leopard Man (1943), The Black Hills Express (1943) and Career Girl (1944).

Heath was born in Lexington, Kentucky. She was married to Shipley Bayliss. She died in July 1973 in Santa Barbara, California, at the age of 51.

Filmography

Film

References

External links 

Rotten Tomatoes profile

1922 births
1973 deaths
People from Lexington, Kentucky
Actresses from Kentucky
American film actresses
20th-century American actresses